Péter Zollman (Budapest, June 14 1931 – Bristol, December 3, 2013) was a Hungarian-born scientist, research physicist, engineer, inventor and translator of literary works.

Biography

Technology
He attended Berzsenyi Dániel High School (where he met George Soros and George Klein), then to the Budapest University of Technology: first as a general engineer, then as a weak-current electrical engineer at the Faculty of Mechanical and Electrical Engineering (where he worked as a demonstrator at Charles Simonyi's department for two years). He then worked at United Incandescent Lamp and Electricity Company (he met Zoltán Lajos Bay there), where he also produced microwave tubes, klystrons, and travelling-wave tubes for radar equipment; he was appointed head of department there.

At the end of November 1956 he left Hungary and moved to London. Dennis Gabor read a publication of his and, on the basis of it, offered him a research position in his laboratory, where he was working on the development of the flat television picture tube – he was aided in that by an invention of Zollman's, which he expounded in his doctoral thesis. He then joined a mechanical engineering company as a development engineer and even became its manager, but he sought a different challenge: he became the technical manager of a huge British global company active in a wide range of fields, from banknote printing, creating banknote- and cheque-printing machines to semiconductors and household appliances.

He went on to work on remote control of tunnelling and mining machinery, including the large electron-proton collider at CERN near Geneva and the Channel Tunnel, but his equipment was also used in the Soviet Union on hundreds of tunnels for the Baikal–Amur Mainline. Their designs and products were sold in America, Germany, France and Japan. Correcting any possible mistake afterwards would have been extremely difficult and expensive, and could have ruined their company, so they had to strive for perfection. In the course of his work, he was able to negotiate in four languages, by his account, thanks to his upbringing in Hungary, although it was in England where he learned French. More than a hundred of his patents have been known to the world.

Translation
In 1993, after a sudden epiphany, he gave up the active management of his company and started translating poetry, essentially because he wanted to make Hungarian poetry accessible to his non-Hungarian-speaking daughters. He felt that there were very few translations that made Hungarian poetry accessible to English speakers, so as a trial he first translated Mihály Babits' poem The Danaïds, which he admitted he did with relative ease and good results. In the years that followed, he translated hundreds of more serious poems, mainly those in which formal accuracy was important. He found that form was important in Hungarian poetry, more so than in English poetry, for instance. As he wrote: "translating Hungarian poetry is such a pleasure that it gilds my life."

George Klein, in a study of Attila József in Pietà, quoted the opening lines of the poem My Homeland as untranslatable into any other language. Zollman translated them in more than forty forms, hoping that one of them will turn out really beautiful.

 commented on Zollman's translation of Attila József's poem For My Birthday: "All but one translator have failed at the passage Én egész népemet fogom / nem középiskolás fokon / taní-tani! His name is Peter Zollman; this is how he solved it: I’ll teach my nation one and all / much greater things than what you call / college knowledge."

In addition, he translated Csongor and Tünde by Mihály Vörösmarty, Laodameia by Mihály Babits and Duke Bluebeard's Castle by Béla Balázs.

One of his most significant works is his translation of János Arany's poem The Bards of Wales, which formed the basis for the eponymous composition of Welsh composer Karl Jenkins' cantata, performed to great acclaim in the UK and Budapest.

Awards and honours
 Queen's Award, England – three times (one for their tunnelling equipment and two for outstanding export performance)
  (1999, Hungarian Academy of Sciences)
  (2002)
 Nominated "Best Book of the Year" by Seamus Heaney (for translations of Attila József, TLS, 2005)
 The Times' Stephen Spender Prize (for the translation of 's poem Aeneas and Dido, 2007)
 Shortlisted twice in the top 6 for the Oxford-Weidenfeld Translation Prize (first for the translation of Sándor Kányádi's There is a Land, and second for 's Selected Poems, in 2001 and 2004)
 Knight's Cross of the Order of Merit of the Republic of Hungary (2013)

Volumes with his translations

Bilingual volumes of poetry published by Maecenas Kiadó
 36 vers = 36 poems by Dezső Kosztolányi. Budapest, Maecenas, 2000. 
 43 vers = 43 poems by Attila József. Az utószót írta: George Szirtes. Budapest, Maecenas.  ; Newry, Northern Ireland, Abbey Press, 2005.  Appointed as Best Book of the Year by Seamus Heaney, 2005.
 51 vers = 51 poems by Ágnes Nemes Nagy. Budapest, Maecenas, 2007. 
 37 vers = 37 poems by György Faludy. Peter Zollman. Budapest, Maecenas, 2010.  Részlet

Other bi- or multilingual volumes 
 Csongor és Tünde : Verses tündérszínjáték = The Quest Csongor and Tünde : A fairytale play in verse by Mihály Vörösmarty. Budapest, Merlin Nemzetközi Színház, 1996. 
 Nine ballads : of guilt and remorse ; The Nightingale : a village satire = Kilenc ballada és a fülemile by János Arany. Budapest, Atlantis / Merlin, 1997. 
 Duke Bluebeard’s Castle = A kékszakállú herceg vára by Béla Balázs. Opera libretto and verse-drama by Béla Balázs; János Kass; Peter Zollman; György Kroó. Budapest, 1998. 
 Láodamía : 20th century verse-drama from the Homeric cycle = Laodameia by Mihály Babits. Budapest, [Merlin Nemzetközi Színház], 1999. 
 Sodrásban = In mid-stream : talks and speeches by Árpád Göncz. Budapest, Corvina Books, 1999.

In English and other languages  
 Last poems from a Nazi lager in Serbia by Miklós Radnóti [Written in a Nazi labour camp before he was murdered fifty years ago. 1944–1994],  [Surrey], Babel, 1994. 
 Babel : poems and translations. 1994 
 Babel : poetry translations mainly from Hungarian, 1993–1996. (Hungarian and English). Walton-on-Thames, 1997 (reprint) 
 Poetry Translations Mainly from Hungarian. Edited and translated by Peter Zollman. London: Babel, 1997. 
 Sándor Kányádi: There Is a Land. Selected Poems. Budapest, Corvina, 2000. 
Budapest : Fekete Sas, 2001. 
 :  The Witching Time of Night. Chicago, Atlantis-Centaur, 2003. 
 : Selected Poems (with contributions from Mitchael Longley, George Szirtes, Bill Tinley, John W. Wilkinson) [Nominated for the Oxford-Weidenfeld Translation Prize]. Newry, Northern Ireland, Abbey Press, 2003. 
 Éva Tóth: Emlékvers 17 nyelven = Memorial Poem in 17 languages Pomáz, Kráter Műhely Egyesület, 2006. 
 András Gerevich: Tiresias's Confesson. Translated by Thomas Cooper, David Hill, George Szirtes and Christopher Whyte. Corvina, 2008. 
 Profán paletta : Karafiáth Orsolya versei. "Profane palette: Poems by ". Budapest : Panderma, 2009
 The Bards of Wales, 2011

In English-language anthologies  
 Attila Jozsef’s Poems and Fragments. Budapest / Maynooth : Argumentum / Cardinal Press, 1999. 
 The Right to Sanity : a  reader. Budapest : Corvina, 1999. 
 , Vol. 1.: an Anthology of Hungarian Poetry in English Translation from the 13th Century to the Present, 1. kötet, Chicago, Atlantis Centaur, 1996.
 , Vol. 1 – Second, Revised Edition. (Edited by ) Chicago, University of Illinois Press : Budapest, Tertia, 2000. 
 , Vol. 2, An Anthology of Hungarian Poetry from the Start of the 20th Century to the Present in English Translation. (Edited by ) Chicago, 2003. 
 The Audit is Done : A Taste of 20th Century Hungarian Poetry = Kész a leltár : Egy évszázad félszáz magyar verse angolul (in Hungarian and in English) by Peter Zollman; János Kass. Budapest, Új Világ Kiadó, Antonin Liehm Alapítvány, 2003. Online version (European Cultural Review, 14., ISSN 1219-7149)
 An Island of Sound: Hungarian Poetry and Fiction before and beyond the Iron Curtain. Ed.: G. Szirtes és M. Vajda. London : Harvill, 2004. 
 Hide and Seek. Contemporary Hungarian Literature. Ed.: Györgyi Horváth and Anna Benedek. Budapest, József Attila Kör, 2004. 
 The Lost Rider – A Bilingual Anthology: The Corvina Book of Hungarian Verse. Selected and edited by Péter Dávidházi, Győző Ferencz, László Kúnos, Szabolcs Várady, and George Szirtes. Budapest: Corvina, 1997.  Later edition: The Lost Rider – A Bilingual Anthology (ed.: Miklós Kozma). Corvina Kiadó Kft., 2007. 
 The Times Stephen Spender Prize, 2007 Archived with the date December 22, 2015, at Wayback Machine. Zollman Péter's award-winning translation in the booklet: : Aeneas and Dido
 A Tribute to Attila József On the 70th anniversary of his death. Ed.: Tamás Kabdebó. Newry (Northern Ireland), Abbey Press, 2007. 
 New Order – Hungarian Poets of the Post-1989 Generation. Ed.: George Szirtes. ARC Publications, 2010. 
 I lived on this Earth: An anthology of poems on the Holocaust. Alba Press, 2012. 
 Inspired by Hungarian poetry: British poets in conversation with Attila József Archived with the date February 25, 2017, at Wayback Machine. . Péter Zollman's translations: József Attila: For my Birthday, By The Danube, You Came with a Stick.

References

Londonban is tapsikolnak a jázminok – Londoni beszélgetés Zollman Péterrel "The jasmines are applauding in London as well – A London conversation with Péter Zollman" (Fizikai Szemle "Physics Review", 1999/11, p. 409)
 Elhunyt Zollman Péter, műfordító "Péter Zollman, literary translator has deceased" (Litera.hu, 2013)
 Péter Zollman memorial page (at the website of the István Baka Foundation)

External links
Some of his poem translations  (Babelmatrix.org)
In Memoriam Peter Zollman (1931–2013) Archived with the date February 25, 2017, at Wayback Machine.
Peter Zollman: Scientist who worked on the Channel Tunnel and translated into English the verse of his native Hungary

British people of Hungarian descent
Hungarian translators
1931 births
2013 deaths
Hungarian mechanical engineers
Hungarian electrical engineers
Hungarian–English translators